Keldholme Priory was a Cistercian nunnery in Kirkbymoorside, North Yorkshire, England. It was established by one of the Robert de Stutvilles in either the reign of  Henry I or II.  Two graves are visible, built into the wall of the modern Priory, a house built on the site of the nunnery. The Priory experienced great upheaval in the early 14th century during a disputed election as to who would be Prioress.

References

Monasteries in North Yorkshire
Cistercian nunneries in England
12th-century establishments in England
Christian monasteries established in the 12th century
1536 disestablishments in England
Kirkbymoorside